Rüdiger Lautmann (born 22 December 1935) is a German professor of sociology and one of the most prominent LGBT scholars in Germany.

Biography 
Born in Koblenz, Lautmann lived during his childhood in Düsseldorf, where he went to school. He first studied German law. After he finished his law studies, he started a second study in sociology. Lautmann worked after university studies first in Münster and then in Bielefeld (for Niklas Luhmann). In 1971 he became then professor in sociology at University of Bremen. In 2001 Lautmann retired as professor.

In 2005 Lautmann married his boyfriend in Hamburg. There he leads the Institut für Sicherheits- und Präventionsforschung. In 2009 he moved to Berlin.

Controversy 
His 1994 book, Die Lust am Kind, is often touted by pro-pedophile activists; he has since distanced himself from this book in response to public criticism in Germany.

Works by Lautmann in German 

 Die Funktion des Rechts in der modernen Gesellschaft (together with Werner Maihofer and Helmut Schelsky): Jahrbuch für Rechtssoziologie und Rechtstheorie, First Ed., Bielefeld: Bertelsmann. 1970.
 Die Polizei. Soziologische Studien und Forschungsberichte (together with Johannes Feest): Opladen. 1971.
 Justiz – die stille Gewalt. Teilnehmende Beobachtung und entscheidungssoziologische Analyse. Frankfurt/Main 1972.
 Lexikon zur Soziologie (together with Werner Fuchs). Opladen: Westdeutscher Verlag. 1973; 3. Ed. 1994. ; 4.  Ed. 2002/2003.
 Sozialwissenschaftliche Studien zur Homosexualität. Berlin: Verlag rosa Winkel. 1980 to 1997.
 Der Zwang zur Tugend. Die gesellschaftliche Kontrolle der Sexualitäten. Frankfurt/Main: Suhrkamp. 1984.
 Das pornographierte Begehren (with Michael Schetsche). Frankfurt/New York 1990.
 Homosexualität. Handbuch der Theorie- und Forschungsgeschichte, Frankfurt/Main: Campus. 1993.
 Die Lust am Kind. Portrait des Pädophilen, Hamburg: Ingrid Klein Verlag GmbH. 1994. 
 Nationalsozialistischer Terror gegen Homosexuelle. Verdrängt und ungesühnt (together with Burkhard Jellonnek): Paderborn: Schöningh. 2002.

References

External links 
  Rüdiger Lautmann in German National Library
 Official Website by Rüdiger Lautmann
 Website of Institut für Sicherheits- und Präventionsforschung

German sociologists
1935 births
German gay writers
German LGBT rights activists
Pedophile advocacy
Writers from Koblenz
Living people
People from the Rhine Province
German LGBT scientists
Gay academics
Gay scientists
LGBT educators